Kasey Garret Olenberger (born 18 March 1978) is a former professional baseball pitcher. Listed at 6 ft 4 in (193 cm), 243 lb (110 kg), Olenberger batted and threw right handed. He was born in Santa Rosa, California.

Olenberger went undrafted out of Long Beach State where he played college baseball. He began his professional career in 2002 with the Solano Steelheads of the independent Western League. He spent another season with Solano and two seasons with Parma in the Italian Baseball League before being signed by the Los Angeles Angels in advance of the 2005 season. His father was a scout for the Angels . Olenberg spent three seasons with the Triple-A Salt Lake Bees where he set a single-season team record in 2006 with 180 innings pitched. He later spent time in the farm systems of the Florida Marlins and Arizona Diamondbacks.

A member of the Italy national baseball team, Olenberger competed in the 2004 Summer Olympics, as well as in the 2006 and 2009 World Baseball Classic tournaments.

He also has pitched for the Bravos de Margarita, Cardenales de Lara and Pastora de los Llanos clubs of the Venezuelan Professional Baseball League.

References

External links

1978 births
Living people
American people of Italian descent
Arkansas Travelers players
Baseball players at the 2004 Summer Olympics
Baseball players from California
Bravos de Margarita players
Cardenales de Lara players
American expatriate baseball players in Venezuela
Ceci Negri Parma players
American expatriate baseball players in Italy
Jacksonville Suns players
New Orleans Zephyrs players
Olympic baseball players of Italy
Pastora de los Llanos players
Reno Aces players
Salt Lake Bees players
Solano Steelheads players
Sportspeople from Santa Rosa, California
2006 World Baseball Classic players
2009 World Baseball Classic players